Montana Avenue is a primarily residential tree-lined street that stretches from Ocean Avenue in Santa Monica, California to the West L.A. Veterans Administration at Bringham Avenue in the Brentwood district of Los Angeles. A non-contiguous segment of Montana Avenue then continues east of the Veterans Administration in the Brentwood Glen neighborhood to Veteran Avenue at UCLA when it becomes Gayley Avenue. Gayley Avenue later becomes Midvale Avenue at its intersection with Wilshire Boulevard.

It is a well-known upscale shopping dining destination for both locals and visitors.

Shopping and dining district
Montana Avenue is most famous for more than 150 upscale boutiques and restaurants in the portion from 7th to 17th Streets in Santa Monica. Many celebrities frequent the district. The district is home to popular restaurants, coffee shops and more, including Beaming, Andrew's Cheese Shop, and Art's Table.

Public transportation
The western portion is served by Santa Monica Transit line 18, and the section by UCLA is served by LACMTA line 602.

North of Montana

Two elementary schools, Roosevelt and Franklin are also on Montana.

Homes north of Montana in the 90402 (Santa Monica) ZIP code are considered to be among the most expensive in Los Angeles County, ranging from $2.5 million to $30 million. South of Montana are mainly businesses, condos and single family homes.

References

External links

Streets in Santa Monica, California
Shopping districts and streets in Greater Los Angeles